Spišská Teplica is a large village and municipality in Poprad District in the Prešov Region of northern Slovakia. It lies on the foothills of High Tatras.

Geography
The municipality lies at an elevation of 704 metres (2,310 ft) and covers an area of 31.121 km² (12.016 mi²). It has a population of about 2000 people.

History
In historical records the village was first mentioned in 1280.

Infrastructure and economy
Touristics dominates the village economy. In the village are several pensions and recreational facilities. Some locals work in industrial enterprises in Poprad and Svit.

References

External links
http://spisskateplica.e-obce.sk

Villages and municipalities in Poprad District
Spiš